Dithiooxamide, also known as rubeanic acid is an organic compound. It is the sulfur analog of oxamide. It acts as a chelating agent, e.g. in the detection or determination of copper. It has also been used as a building block in the synthesis of cyclen.

References

Thioamides